Baneswell is an inner-city district in the city of Newport, South Wales. It is in the electoral ward of Stow Hill, and located next to the city centre and Newport railway station.

Districts of Newport, Wales